Samuel Simon Fox (May 4, 1918 – April 11, 2004) was an American football end who played one season for the New York Giants. He was the head coach of the Ottawa Rough Riders in 1947.

Early life
Sammy Fox was born on May 4, 1918 in Washington D.C. He went to high school at Central (DC).

College career
He went to college at Ohio State.

Professional career
New York Giants

In 1945, he played for the New York Giants. He played in 8 games and had 10 catches for 120 yards. He also had 2 touchdowns.

Jersey City Giants

In 1946, he played 1 game for the minor league Jersey City Giants.

Paterson Panthers

In the same year, he played 5 games for the Paterson Panthers. He had one touchdown.

Coaching career
Ottawa Rough Riders

In 1947, he coached the Ottawa Rough Riders. They had a 8–4 record.

Later life
He died on April 11, 2004. He was 85 at the time of his death.

References

1918 births
2004 deaths
New York Giants players
Ottawa Rough Riders coaches
Players of American football from Washington, D.C.